The 2022 Road Rager was the second annual Road Rager professional wrestling television special produced by All Elite Wrestling (AEW). It was held on June 15, 2022, in St. Louis, Missouri at the Chaifetz Arena,  encompassing the broadcasts of AEW's weekly television programs, Wednesday Night Dynamite, which aired live on TBS, and Friday Night Rampage, which aired on tape delay on June 17 on TNT. The 2022 event expanded upon the previous year, which was only held as a special episode of Dynamite.

Production

Background

Storylines
Road Rager featured professional wrestling matches that involved different wrestlers from pre-existing scripted feuds and storylines. Wrestlers portrayed heroes, villains, or less distinguishable characters in scripted events that built tension and culminated in a wrestling match or series of matches. Storylines were produced on AEW's weekly television program, Dynamite, the supplementary online streaming shows, Dark and Elevation, and The Young Bucks' YouTube series Being The Elite.

Reception

Television ratings
Dynamite averaged 761,000 television viewers on TBS and a 0.28 rating in the 18-49 demographic, AEW's key demographic. This was down from the 939,000 viewership total of the previous week's episode.

Rampage averaged 331,000 television viewers on TNT, with a 0.10 rating in the 18-49 demographic. This was also down from the 476,000 viewership total of the previous week.

Results

Dynamite (aired June 15)

Rampage (aired June 17)

References

External links
All Elite Wrestling Official website

2022 American television episodes
AEW Road Rager
All Elite Wrestling shows
Events in St. Louis
June 2022 events in the United States
Professional wrestling in Missouri
Professional wrestling in St. Louis
2022 in professional wrestling